{{DISPLAYTITLE:Sigma3 Cancri}}

Sigma3 Cancri (σ3 Cancri) is a solitary, yellow-hued star in the zodiac constellation of Cancer. With an apparent visual magnitude of +5.24, it is a dim star that is visible to the naked eye. Based upon an annual parallax shift of 11.03 mas as seen from Earth, it is located around 296 light years from the Sun. The star's proper motion makes it a candidate for membership in the IC 2391 supercluster.

This is an evolved, G-type giant star with a stellar classification of G9 III. At the estimated age of 420 million years it is a red clump star on the horizontal branch, which indicates it is generating energy through helium fusion at its core. Sigma3 Cancri has 2.8 times the mass of the Sun and has expanded to 10.3 times the Sun's radius. It is radiating 72 times the solar luminosity from its photosphere at an effective temperature of 5,170 K.

References

G-type giants
Horizontal-branch stars
Cancri, Sigma3
Cancer (constellation)
Durchmusterung objects
Cancri, 64
076813
044154
3575